Elizabeth Ofosu-Adjare (born March 1, 1974)  is a Ghanaian lawyer and politician who served as  Minister for Tourism, Culture and Creative Arts. She was appointed to this position by President John Mahama in 2013  when he formed his first substantive government. She is a member of the National Democratic Congress. She is currently a member for the 8th Parliament of the 4th Republic of Ghana representing the Techiman North Constituency.

Early life and education
Mrs. Elizabeth Ofosu-Adjare is the third of ten girls of born to her parents, late Hon Adjei-Mensah a lawyer, businessman and Politician and Mrs. Adjei-Mensah a businesswoman. She attended the St Monica's Secondary School in Mampong, Kumasi where she obtained both her O & A level certificates. Elizabeth Ofosu-Adjare then proceeded to the Kwame Nkrumah University of Science and Technology where she obtained a Bachelor of Arts in Social Science. She continued to the University of Ghana, Legon to pursue further studies in the field of Law and obtained honors in LLB in 2002. She later  obtained a  degree in law  in 2004.

Career 
Mrs. Elizabeth Ofosu-Adjare started her legal practice with the Holy Trinity Chambers in Kumasi, Ashanti Region in 2004 and rose to become a partner of the Firm. She also became a lawyer for the Legal Aid Scheme in the Ashanti Region. She has been a board member of the Multi Trust Financial Company in Kumasi from 2004 till date. She is currently a board member of the Federation Commodities Limited.

She was appointed to the Board of the Tema Oil Refinery in 2009 by the President of the Republic of Ghana and served from 2009 to 2013. Elizabeth Ofosu-Adjare was appointed on 1 March 2013 by President John Dramani Mahama to the newly created/realigned Ministry of Tourism, Culture & Creative Arts.

Political career

As Ministry of Tourism, Culture & Creative Arts 
Ofosu-Adjare was appointed on 1 March 2013 by President John Dramani Mahama to the newly created/realigned Ministry of Tourism, Culture & Creative Arts. As the Sector Minister, she worked creditably with fourteen (14) Agencies under her ministry introduced innovative,novelty tourism programs as an addition to Ghana's Tourism products & Offerings.

ExploreGhana project 
Worthy of mention is the ExploreGhana project launched in 2014 to stimulate and drive domestic tourism in Ghana. After three years of the launch, domestic tourism has received wide coverage by media outlets & organizations. Thus ensuring the country is promoting ‘’Responsible Tourism’’ which offers a diverse tourism product mix, which both local and international tourists benefit from.

National Festival for Arts & Culture 
Another major traditional festival introduced was the Homogeneous Festival for the Ga State. For the first time in Ghana, the ministry nurtured this Homogeneous Festival to ensure the Greater Accra Region has its own brand festival. She also restructured the National Festival for Arts & Culture (NAFAC) and the famous Ghana Carnival introduced in her maiden year in office.
She is also credited with the setting up of Tourism levy secretariat to help improve the collection & payment of the 1% Tourism levy. This levy has generated substantial funds for the execution of tourism projects especially in the area in of capacity building and tourism promotion.

Film Bill 
Other achievements of  Mrs. Ofosu-Adjare was done in the area of a legislative framework to support the work of the creative Arts industry. She led the passage of the Film Bill, which went through cabinet and was approved by Parliament into become law. This new bill replaced the old Film Act of 1961 and was the first time such a new legislative framework was introduced to ensure the Film and Television sector got the much-needed legal backing in Ghana.

Back to Seychelles Trip 
She led a high powered Government Delegation to accompany the return of the King of Ashanti Kingdom, Asantehene Otumfuo Osei Tutu II to the Seychelles Islands where the King of Ashanti, Nana Prempeh I was sent to exile during the Ashanti-British war in 1900. It was the first time a sitting Ashanti King has visited the Seychelles Islands.

International roles 
On the International level, she has led Ghana's tourism sector by consistently appearing  at the major Tourism fairs and exhibitions like the World Travel Market, International Tourism Bourse (ITB), FITUR International Travel Fair, Vakantiebeurs Holiday Fair,  & China Outbound Tourism & Travel Market (COTTM). Never before has Ghana been marketed on the international level since the last three years of her tenure as the Sector Minister.

She lobbied her colleague African Ministers & the top echelons of the United Nations World Tourism Organization (UNWTO) to have Ghana host the first ever Brand Africa conference in Accra in August 2015. Her popularity and energetic role in the International Tourism matters helped Ghana to be elected on to the Executive Council of the UN Tourism body at its 21st UNWTO Session in Medellin Colombia.

Committees 
She is a member of the Health Committee and also a member of the Appointments Committee.

Personal life 
She is married to Mr. Lawrence Ofosu-Adjare. She is the daughter of the late Isaac Kwadwo Adjei-Mensah, who served as Minister of Water Resources, Works and Housing during the Rawlings government, and was also Member of Parliament for Techiman North where she currently is an MP.

See also
 List of Mahama government ministers
 List of Mills government ministers

References

External links and sources 

Living people
1974 births
Government ministers of Ghana
National Democratic Congress (Ghana) politicians
Tourism ministers of Ghana
Women government ministers of Ghana
St. Monica's Senior High School alumni
21st-century Ghanaian women politicians
21st-century Ghanaian politicians
Ghanaian women lawyers
Ghanaian MPs 2021–2025
21st-century Ghanaian lawyers